The 1990 Paris–Tours was the 84th edition of the Paris–Tours cycle race and was held on 14 October 1990. The race started in Chaville and finished in Tours. The race was won by Rolf Sørensen of the Ariostea team.

General classification

References

1990 in French sport
1990
1990 UCI Road World Cup
1990 in road cycling
October 1990 sports events in Europe